The Chapel Hill Herald is an American, English language daily newspaper headquartered in Durham, Orange County, North Carolina.  The newspaper was founded in 1988.  The Chapel Hill herald is affiliated with The Herald-Sun.

See also
 List of newspapers in North Carolina

References

Daily newspapers published in North Carolina